Haqqani or Haqani may refer to:

Things
 Haqqani Anjuman, an organisation in Bangladesh
 Haqqani network, an insurgent group in Afghanistan and Pakistan 
 Haghani Circle (also Haqqani), a Shi'i school of thought (philosophy)
 Naqshbandi-Haqqani Golden Chain, the lineage of a Sufi Naqshbandi religion order

People
 Abdul Fatah Haqqani (?–2011), Afghanistani who was held in the Bagram Internment Facility
 Anas Haqqani, Afghan Taliban leader, commander and poet
 Ezatullah Haqqani (born c. 1963), Taliban civil leader
 Husain Haqqani (born 1956), Pakistani diplomat
 Ibrahim Haqqani, prominent member of the Zadran tribe
 Irshad Ahmed Haqqani (1928–2010), journalist from Pakistan
 Jalaluddin Haqqani (1939–2018), Afghan military leader
 Khalil Haqqani, senior member of the Haqqani network
 Nazim Al-Haqqani (1922–2014), Turkish Cypriot Sufi and leader of the Naqshbandi-Haqqani Order
 Sayeedur Rahman Haqani, senior member of the Taliban leadership
 Sirajuddin Haqqani (born c. 1970), Pashtun military leader
 Yahya Haqqani, senior member of the Haqqani network, on the Rewards for Justice Terror List